The House of Pálffy ab Erdöd, also known as Pálffy von Erdöd, Pálffy de Erdöd, or Pálffy of Erdöd, is the name of a Hungarian noble family. Several members of the family held significant positions in the Habsburg monarchy.

History 
The Hungarian name Pálffy derives from the Latin term Pauli filius (son of Paul), after the first known ancestor of the family.

Erdőd is the Hungarian name for Ardud, a town situated in Transylvania.

The Pálffy ab Erdöd family members bore as well the title of Baron or Baroness of Újezd, of the name of their Czech barony of Újezd.

The family crest is of a deer above a wooden wheel which was created supposedly after an incident in the forest. The legend says that members of the Pálffy family were travelling in a horse-drawn carriage in the forest at night and in the mist when a deer shot out from the forest and hit the side of the carriage, breaking a wheel and killing the deer. The entourage decided to stay there until morning to fix the wheel. When morning arrived and the mist had cleared, they had stopped just before a cliff edge so the family realised that deer had saved their lives. In its honour, the family crest was created.

In the 17th, 18th and 19th centuries, the family owned many castles and large residences. It's said that they owned up to 99 castles.

Notable members
Paul Pálffy ab Erdöd (1580/1589–1653), Palatine of Hungary, Knight of the Golden Fleece
Nikolaus VI Graf Pálffy ab Erdöd (1657/67–1732), field marshal and Palatine of Hungary, Knight of the Golden Fleece
Johann Bernhard Stephan, Graf Pálffy ab Erdöd (1664–1751), field marshal, Knight of the Golden Fleece
 Countess Maria Augustina Pálffy ab Erdöd (1714–1759), mother of Joseph, Count Kinsky and Franz Joseph, Count Kinsky
Leopold, Count Pálffy-Daun von Erdöd (1716–1773), field marshal
 Karl, Count Palffy ab Erdöd (1735–1816), Knight of the Golden Fleece 	
 Count Ferdinand Pálffy von Erdöd (1774–1840), mining engineer and civil servant of the Austrian Empire
 Count Fidelius Pálffy ab Erdöd (1788–1864), Knight of the Golden Fleece
 Count Moritz Pálffy ab Erdöd (1812–1897), Knight of the Golden Fleece 	
 Count Paul Pálffy ab Erdöd (1890–1968), Hungarian sportsman
 Count Fidél Pálffy ab Erdőd (1895–1946), Hungarian politician 
 Ferdinand Leopold Graf Pálffy-Daun ab Erdöd, honorary citizen of Vienna
 Count Geza Palffy ab Erdod, Member of parliament and resistance fighter, highlighted in the Terror Museum

See also 
Pálffy

Notes

Austrian noble families
Counts of the Holy Roman Empire

Hungarian noble families